Home: A Live Concert Recording with the Atlanta Symphony Youth Orchestra is a live album by Atlanta-based American alternative rock band, Collective Soul. The performance is from two live Atlanta concerts with the Atlanta Symphony Youth Orchestra. The album peaked at #183 on the Billboard 200.

Track listing
All songs written by Ed Roland, except where noted.

Disc one
"Orchestral Intro" – 0:27
"Counting the Days" – 2:45
"Listen" – 4:33
"December" – 5:17
"Compliment" (E. Roland, Dean Roland) – 3:38
"Precious Declaration" – 4:14
"Needs" – 5:47
"Heavy" – 3:20
"Run" – 4:50
"The World I Know" (Ross Childress, E. Roland) – 5:01
"Pretty Donna" – 4:02
"Youth" – 3:05

Disc two
"Crown" – 5:12
"Under Heaven's Skies" – 3:40
"She Said" – 4:44
"Home" (Dexter Green, E. Roland) – 4:25
"Gel" – 3:16
"How Do You Love" – 4:33
"Better Now" (Green, E. Roland) – 7:07
"Satellite" – 4:44
"Shine" – 6:25
"Burn" (Bonus studio track) – 3:40
"How Do You Love" (Video)

References

2006 live albums
Collective Soul albums
Self-released albums
Collaborative albums